Mulka Govinda Reddy (1916-2013) was an Indian politician belonging  to  the Indian National Congress. He was earlier a member of the Praja Socialist Party. He was elected to the Rajya Sabha, upper house of the Parliament of India from Karnataka.

He was a founding member of the India China Friendship Association (ICFA), founded in 1949, and was the first president of ICFA Karnataka.

References

Rajya Sabha members from Karnataka
Indian National Congress politicians
Praja Socialist Party politicians
1916 births
2013 deaths
Indian National Congress politicians from Karnataka